Dimitrios Papanikolis (1790–1855) was a naval hero of the Greek Revolution, famous for being the first to successfully employ a fireship to destroy an Ottoman ship of the line.

Life 
Papanikolis was born on the island of Psara in 1790. At an early age he joined his father, Georgios, in his trading travels, and participated in fights with the corsairs of the Barbary Coast.

During the first months of the Greek War of Independence, the Greek naval vessels, mostly converted and armed merchantmen, were unable to confront the larger and better-armed Ottoman warships. The rebels therefore decided to use fireships. This led to the generalized use of fireships by the Greeks, who were thus able to even the balance with the far more powerful Ottoman Navy. Papanikolis remained active for the remainder of the war, distinguishing himself again in the Battle of Gerontas in August 1824.

In 1829, after the war's end, he purchased a 1/3 share in the brig Nelson, and pursued trade with it until 1833, when the ship was purchased and commissioned into the Royal Hellenic Navy, with Papanikolis as captain. In 1836 however the ship sank after ramming a reef off Zakynthos, and Papanikolis was placed in suspended service until 1841, when he was given command of the corvette Amalia.

In 1843, after the 3 September 1843 Revolution, he was elected as a representative of Psara for the constituent assembly. In 1846, he was placed as chairman of the naval court, retaining the post until his death in 1855.

Honours 
In addition to several roads throughout Greece, three submarines of the Hellenic Navy have been named after him.

References

 Short summary from the website of the Hellenic Parliament

1790 births
1855 deaths
Greek people of the Greek War of Independence
Hellenic Navy officers
People from Psara